Retro style is an outdated style or fashion that has become fashionable again.

Retro may also refer to:

Entertainment 

Retro (TV channel), a Latin American cable television network
Retro Television Network, a US network primarily airing classic programming
Retro Productions, a New York City theatre company
Retro Studios, an American video game developer
Retro (DJ) (born 1987), English electronic music artist

Music 
 Retro (EP), a 1978 EP by Ultravox
 Retro (KMFDM album)
 Retro (Lou Reed album)
 Retro (New Order album)
 Retro (Regine Velasquez album)
 Retro, an album by Rick Wakeman

See also
 Retro, a Building Industry Association of Washington workers' compensation insurance program
Retro, Queensland, a locality in the Central Highlands, Australia
Retrograde analysis, a type of problem in games, especially chess
Retrorocket, a rocket engine
Retrospective, a look back at events that took place, or works that were produced, in the past